Mehmet Kraja (1952) is an Albanian writer, literary critic and journalist. He is the current president of the Academy of Sciences and Arts of Kosovo.

He was born on 27 June 1952, in Kostanjica (Kështenjë) in Bar Municipality (Kraja region) in present-day Montenegro. He studied Albanian language and literature at the University of Pristina. In 1992-1999, he lived in Tirana as representative of the then unrecognized internationally government of Kosovo and as editor of the newspaper Rilindja. He has written twelve novels, four collections of short stories, ten theatrical plays and five non-fiction works.

References

1952 births
Albanian writers
People from Bar, Montenegro
Members of the Academy of Sciences of Albania
Living people
Albanians in Montenegro
Members of the Academy of Sciences and Arts of Kosovo